Henry Edward Reynolds (1905–1980) was Mayor of Madison, Wisconsin. He held the office from 1961 to 1965.

References

Mayors of Madison, Wisconsin
1905 births
1980 deaths
20th-century American politicians